The governor of Nevada is the head of government of the U.S. state of Nevada. The governor is the head of the executive branch of the Nevada state government. The governor is also the commander-in-chief of the state's military forces. The governor has a duty to enforce state laws and the power to either approve or veto bills passed by the Nevada Legislature, to convene the legislature at any time, as well as, except in cases of treason or impeachment, to grant pardons and reprieves.

The governor serves a four-year term. They are limited to two terms, even if they are non-consecutive. If a person ascends to the governorship and serves more than two years of a previous governor's term, they are only eligible to run for one full term. Candidates for governor must be at least 25 years old, and must have been citizens of Nevada for at least two years, at the time of election. The lieutenant governor of Nevada is not elected on the same ticket as the governor.

The current governor is Republican Joe Lombardo, who took office on January 2, 2023.

Qualifications
Anyone who seeks to be elected Governor of Nevada must meet the following qualifications:
Be at least 25 years old
Be a registered elector
Be a resident of Nevada for at least two years

History

The first provisional governor of the proposed Territory of Nevada was Whig Isaac Roop, who was elected in September 1859 and took office on December 15 of that year in Genoa. When the territory was incorporated on March 2, 1861, Republican James W. Nye was appointed Territorial Governor by President Abraham Lincoln and served until statehood in 1864. Mark Twain's brother Orion Clemens served as Territorial Secretary to Nye. Nevada became a state on October 31, 1864, and Nye remained acting governor until the first governor, Henry G. Blasdel, took office on December 5, 1864.

There have been 30 Governors of Nevada, eight of whom were actually born within state boundaries. The longest-serving Nevada Governor was Bob Miller, who served two and a half terms from 1989 to 1999. The shortest-serving Nevada Governor was Acting Governor Frank Bell, who served the remaining four months of Charles C. Stevenson's term upon the governor's death. The current governor is Joe Lombardo, who took office on January 2, 2023.

List of governors
Prior to becoming a territory, parts of Nevada were part of Utah Territory and New Mexico Territory; see List of governors of Utah and List of governors of New Mexico.

Succession

See also

References

General

 "[archive.org/web/20090906035749/https://web.archive.org/web/20090906035749/http://gov.state.nv.us/ Governor Jim Gibbons]." State of Nevada. Retrieved September 7, 2009.
 "[archive.org/web/20090912133456/https://web.archive.org/web/20090912133456/http://www.nga.org/portal/site/nga/menuitem.8fd3d12ab65b304f8a278110501010a0?submit=Submit&State=NV Governors of Nevada]." National Governors Association. Retrieved September 7, 2009.
 "Nevada Governors' Biographical Information." Nevada State Library and Archives. Retrieved September 7, 2009.
 "Territorial Officers." Nevada State Library and Archives. Retrieved September 7, 2009.
 "[archive.org/web/20100608191224/https://web.archive.org/web/20160304092333/http://www.leg.state.nv.us/lcb/research/selectedofficersnvlegislature.pdf Selected Officers of the Nevada Legislature]." Nevada Legislature. Retrieved September 7, 2009.

Constitutions

 "The Constitution of the State of Nevada" (1864). Nevada Legislature. Retrieved September 7, 2009.

Nevada

Governors